Pseudorupilia ruficollis aka as the Swollen Restio Beetle is a member of the Chrysomelidae family. Pseudorupilia (Jacoby, 1893) resembles the Australian genus Rupilia (Clark, 1864) whence its generic name. It is known only from South Africa and is strongly associated with the Cape fynbos, feeding on the pollen of Restionaceae, Proteaceae and Asteraceae.

Description

References

External links
A revision of the southern African genus Pseudorupilia Jacoby - Grobbelaar
Image on ispotnature

Galerucinae
Beetles described in 1775
Taxa named by Johan Christian Fabricius
Beetles of Africa
Endemic beetles of South Africa